Aliabad-e Sofla (also Romanized as ‘Alīābād-e Soflá; also known as ‘Alīābād-e Pā'īn) is a village in Chaqa Narges Rural District, Mahidasht District, Kermanshah County, Kermanshah Province, Iran. At the 2006 census, its population was 86, in 18 families.

References 

Populated places in Kermanshah County